Cory Martin (born May 22, 1985, in Bloomington, Indiana) is an American track and field athlete specializing in the shot put. His best international outing so far is the ninth place at the 2013 World Championships in Moscow.

His indoor personal best is 20.98 meters, set in 2013.

Throwing Career
Martin attended Edgewood high school. He won the 2003 IHSAA state meet in the discus. After high school he attended Auburn University where he was a nine-time All-American and two time national champion. Following his collegiate career he got sponsored by Nike in order to continue throwing competitively.

Competition results

International championship results

Personal Life 
Martin became the throwers coach at Indiana University in 2014.

References

External links 
 

1985 births
Living people
American male shot putters
Sportspeople from Bloomington, Indiana

Track and field athletes from Indiana